Lampard is a family name that may refer to:

 Frank Lampard (born 1978), English former footballer and manager (son of the below)
 Frank Lampard (footballer, born 1948), English former footballer (father of the above)
 Kate Lampard (born 1960), English former barrister
 Michael Lampard (born 1986), Australian opera singer